Billy Peterson (born as Willard Peterson, in Minnesota) is an American bass player, songwriter, composer, session musician and producer. Growing up in a family of professional musicians, Peterson started with music at a very young age. Billy is brother of Paul Peterson (bass guitarist/singer/songwriter/keyboardist) and Ricky Peterson (keyboardist/singer/song writer/producer).

Career

Early career
In 1967, he joined The Righteous Brothers on a summer tour. While going to school, Peterson played bass and drums in local orchestras, big bands, R&B bands and toured with the Lawrence Welk Show All Stars. After high-school, he started playing bass with trumpet-legend Clifford Brown's pianist Billy Wallace until 1973. In the mid 1970s, he was the bassist on three albums of folk guitarist Leo Kottke and also the electric and upright bassist on Bob Dylan's multi-platinum album Blood On The Tracks for Columbia Records.

In 1976, he joined the Gibson guitar staff giving him the opportunity to perform with B.B. King, Johnny Smith, Lenny Breau, Les Paul, and Howard Roberts. During this decade record producer and engineer David Rivkin (aka David Z, who produced Prince in the 1980s) introduced Peterson to keyboardist Ben Sidran, a beginning of a musical partnership remaining strong till today. He released his first solo album “Threshold of Surrender” in 1981. While continuing to tour the US and Europe with various artists, he recorded many albums plus national radio and TV commercials performing from solo bass to playing with a full symphony orchestra.

With the Steve Miller Band
In 1986, Ben Sidran produced an album for Steve Miller and hired Peterson to play bass on the recording Born to be Blue. Afterwards Peterson became a member of the Steve Miller Band for 23 years, until 2010. He started to tour with the Steve Miller Band in spring 1987 and played bass on the Born to Be Blue (Capitol), Steve Miller Band Box Set (Capitol), and Wide River (Polydor) recordings, amongst numerous others. Simultaneously, when possible, he continued to tour Europe and Japan with Ben Sidran and worked on numerous recordings of other artists, including Georgie Fame or Phil Upchurch. In 1990 Peterson played on, produced and arranged Leo Kottke's album "That's What" for which he wrote a composition named “Mid Air”. Shortly after The Artist (also known as Prince) approached him to create a string arrangement for The New Power Generation's dynamo maven, Rosie Gaines. He also re-harmonized Bryan Adams's hit “Everything I Do I Do It For You”. In 2004, he was the musical director and bass player for the Legends Rock TV Show shot in the South of France and produced by Megabien Entertainment.

2010 to present
After leaving the Steve Miller Band, Peterson continues to work with various artists around the world. In 2012 he went on a European Tour with Ben Sidran. Later that year he co-hosted along with Cynthia Johnson the Funkytown Movie, produced by Megabien Entertainment, which showcases some of the Twin Cities´ finest artists and musicians. In 2015, Peterson as the bassist of Bob Dylan's album “Blood on the Tracks” received the GRAMMY Hall of Fame Award, which was inducted due to its significance for musical, social, and cultural history.

Awards
 2015 - Grammy Hall of Fame Award – Induction of Bob Dylan's album "Blood on the Tracks", with Peterson on bass 
 2008 - Mid-American Music Hall of Fame – Induction Award, as a member of “The Peterson Family”
 2007 - Ancient City Blues Society – Honorary Lifetime Membership
 2005 - Minneapolis City Pages - Best Jazz Artist 2005 
 1989 - Minnesota Music Award – Best Jazz Bass
 1988 - Minnesota Music Award – Best Jazz/Fusion Bass Player
 1987 - Minnesota Jazz Music Awards – Special Recognition Award
 1985 - Minnesota Music Award – Jazz-Modern/Mainstream Instrumentalist
 1984 - Minnesota Music Award – Best Jazz Instrumentalist
 1984 - Minnesota Music Award – Best Bass
 1982 - Minnesota Music Award – Best Jazz Instrumentalist
 1975 - Grammy Award - for Bob Dylan's album Blood on the Tracks, with Peterson on bass, awarded for "Best Album Notes". The album also received Double Platinum in the US, Platinum in Canada, Gold in the UK, amongst others.

Discography
 Bob Rockwell: Androids (1974)
 Leo Kottke: Dreams and All That Stuff (1974)
 Leo Kottke: Ice Water (1974)
 Bob Dylan: Blood on the Tracks (1975)
 Art Resnick: Jungleopolis (1975)
 Leo Kottke: Chewing Pine (1975)
 Mark Gaddis: Carousel Man (1976)
 Steve Miller Band: Fly Like an Eagle (1977)
 Dick Pinney: Devil Take My Shiny Coins (1977)
 Michael Johnson: Ain't Dis Da Life (1977)
 Jim Post: I Love My Life (1978)
 Ben Sidran: On the Cool Side (1985)
 Ben Sidran: On the Live Side (1986)
 Prudence Johnson: Vocals (1987)
 Claudia Schmidt: Big Earful (1987)
 Steve Miller: Born 2B Blue (1988) (Capitol)
 Ben Sidran: Too Hot to Touch (1988)
 Bill Goodwin/Hal Galper: No Method (1989)
 Leo Kottke: That's What (1990)
 Ricky Peterson: Smile Blue (1991)
 Ben Sidran: Cool Paradise (1991)
 Larry Long: Troubadour (1992)
 Steve Miller Band:  Wide River (1993) (Polydor)
 Steve Miller Band: Steve Miller Band [Box Set] (1994) (Capitol)
 Neal Schon: Beyond the Thunder (1995)
 Larry Long: Living in a Rich Man's World (1995)
 Neal & Leandra: Old Love (1995)
 Phil Upchurch: Whatever Happened to the Blues (1997)
 Larry Long: Run for Freedom, Sweet Thunder (1997)
 Various Artists: Jazz Christmas (1998)
 The CCM Jazz Ensemble: Lady Bird (1998)
 Jeanne Arland Peterson: Timeless (1999)
 Bob Rockwell: After Hours (1999)
 Bob Malach: After Hours (1999)
 David Hazeltine: After Hours, Vol. 2 (1999)
 Bill Carrothers: After Hours, Vol. 4 (1999)
 Ricky Peterson: Souvenir (1999)
 Irv Williams: Stop, Look, and Listen (2001)
 Leo Kottke: Ice Water (2000)
 Larry Long: Well May the World Go (producer only, 2000)
 Ira Sullivan: After Hours (2001)
 Various Artists: If I Had a Song: The Songs of Pete (2001)
 Clementine Cafe: Apres-midi (2001)
 Various Artists: Go Jazz All Stars: Live in Japan (2001)
 Irv Williams: Encore (2001)
 Lee Konitz: After Hours, Vol. 7 (2002)
 Tony Hymas: Hope Street MN (2002);
 David Aaron Thomas: Wingin' It (2003)
 Leo Kottke: Best of the Capitol Years (2003)
 Ben Sidran/Bob Rockwell: Walk Pretty (2003)
 Ben Sidran: Anthology (2003)
 The Peterson Family: A compilation (2003)
 Irv Williams: That's All (2004)
 Ben Sidran: Nick's Bump (2004)
 Leo Sidran: BOhemia (2004)
 Bob Dylan: The Collection, Vol. 3: Blonde on Blonde/Blood on the Tracks/Infidels (2005)
 Moodfood: Ice (2005)
 Les Paul: American Made World Played (2005)
 Irv Williams: Dedicated to You (2005)
 Soulfood: Power Yoga (2006)
 Soulfood: Buddha Chill (2008)
 Soulfood: Zen Lounge (2009)
 Oleta Adams: Let's Stay Here (2009)
 Steve Miller Band: Bingo! (2010)		
 Steve Miller Band: Let Your Hair Down (2011)
 Irv Williams: Duke's Mixture (2011)
 Claudia Schmidt: Bend in the River - Collected Songs (2012)
 Dave King with Bill Carrothers and Billy Peterson: I've Been Ringing You (2012)
 Steve Miller Band: Young Hearts - Complete Greatest Hits (2013)
 Irv Williams: Then Was Then, Now Is Now (2014)
 Peg Carrothers: Edges of My Mind (2014)
 Ben Sidran: Blue Camus (2015)
 Irv Williams Trio: Pinnacle (2015)
 Billy Peterson and David Hazeltine: Next Door (2016)
 The Peterson Family: Legacy (2017)
for references see allmusic or cduniverse.com

Filmography
 Legends Rock, live TV show (2004)
 Steve Miller Band: Live from Chicago, video documentary (2008)
 The Funkytown Movie, music documentary (2012)

References

External links
 Official Artist Website of Billy Peterson
 Billy Peterson, musical director of Megabien Entertainment
 Billy Peterson, Legends Rock TV Show
 Encyclopedia of Jazz Musicians
 The Peterson Family
 Discogs
 Dave King Trio: Live At The Village Vanguard
 Dave King Trio with Bill Carrothers + Billy Peterson at the Dakota Jazz Club
 Ben Sidran (with Billy Peterson, Bob Rockwell and Leo Sidran) at Ronnie Scott's Jazz Club in London

Living people
Songwriters from Minnesota
Guitarists from Minnesota
American male composers
20th-century American composers
American male bass guitarists
American session musicians
20th-century births
Place of birth missing (living people)
Steve Miller Band members
20th-century American bass guitarists
20th-century American male musicians
Year of birth missing (living people)
American male songwriters